Conchagua (also known as Cochague) is a stratovolcano in southeastern El Salvador, overlooking the Gulf of Fonseca.  Cerro del Ocote and Cerro de la Bandera are the two main summits, with Bandera appearing younger and more conical (see photo).  There are active fumarolic areas on both peaks, but no confirmed historical eruptions. It is surrounded by forest called Bosque Conchagua. Conchagua, in Native American indigenous Salvadoran Lenca language, means (Flying Jaguar). According to historians, the volcano was settled by the Lenca civilization, who worshipped the goddess Comizahual, an indigenous Jaguar Princess. Lenca legends say that Conchagua was Comizahual's favorite volcano, and upon her death she was taken on top on Conchagua where her body turned into many golden Chiltota birds that took off from Conchagua volcano.

Plans for Bitcoin City 
The volcano was selected as the site for the planned "Bitcoin City", a smart city project that will use the energy from the volcano to power its infrastructure, as well as the mining of cryptocurrencies. The project, announced by President Nayib Bukele, will be funded by a $1 billion Bitcoin bond issued by state-owned power company LaGeo. Bukele has promised to make the city a tax haven, saying, “We will have no income tax, forever. No income tax, zero property tax, no procurement tax, zero city tax, and zero CO2 emissions...The only taxes that they will have in Bitcoin City is VAT, half will be used to pay the municipality’s bonds and the rest for the public infrastructure and maintenance of the city.”

The project has been criticized by ecologist Ricardo Navarro. “Geothermal still costs more than oil, otherwise we would already be using more of it. What will end up happening is that we will just be buying more oil," he told The Telegraph.

See also
List of volcanoes in El Salvador
List of stratovolcanoes

References 

 
 

Mountains of El Salvador
Stratovolcanoes of El Salvador
Pleistocene stratovolcanoes